Else Sehrig-Vehling (26 May 1897 in Düsseldorf – 12 February 1994 in Bad Salzuflen) was a German expressionist. She was the daughter of the Architect Heinrich Vehling (1868 in Düsseldorf – 1944 in Koblenz) and of Eva Hubertine (maiden name Habes) (1874 in Düsseldorf – 1953).

She was a member of an artist group called Das junge Rheinland (The Young Rhinelanders). Her style was influenced by her close friendships to Ernst Ludwig Kirchner, Carl Barth, Max Schwimmer, Fritz Winter and other German artists.

In 1921, Else Sehrig-Vehling was one of the first female art students of the Arts Academy of the city of Düsseldorf. The City Museum of Düsseldorf honoured her with an exhibition in 1983, showing her early expressionist works.

In 1933 she married Hermann Sehrig, a German artist and Member of the Deutsche Werkbund. His works are in many public collections such as the German Ceramic Museum.  She is listed in the well known German art dictionary Allgemeines Künstlerlexikon (World Biographical Dictionary of Artists).

Exhibitions

Public collections
At the Stadtmuseum (City Museum) in Düsseldorf - Watercolour 1950 titled "Mädchen" (Girl)

References

 Kunsthalle Düsseldorf (1941): Herbstausstellung Düsseldorfer Künstler. Düsseldorf.
 Verein der Düsseldorfer Künstler (1954): Catalogue:Grosse Weihnachtsausstellung, 1953, der bildenden Künstler von Rheinland und Westfalen im Kunstpalast zu Düsseldorf. Düsseldorf.
 Verein der Düsseldorfer Künstler (1956): Catalogue:Grosse Weihnachtsausstellung, 1953, der bildenden Künstler von Rheinland und Westfalen im Kunstpalast zu Düsseldorf. Düsseldorf.
 Verein der Düsseldorfer Künstler (1957): Catalogue:Grosse Weihnachtsausstellung, 1953, der bildenden Künstler von Rheinland und Westfalen im Kunstpalast zu Düsseldorf. Düsseldorf.
 Verein der Düsseldorfer Künstler (1961): Catalogue:Grosse Weihnachtsausstellung, 1953, der bildenden Künstler von Rheinland und Westfalen im Kunstpalast zu Düsseldorf. Düsseldorf.
 Verein der Düsseldorfer Künstler (1962): Catalogue:Grosse Weihnachtsausstellung, 1953, der bildenden Künstler von Rheinland und Westfalen im Kunstpalast zu Düsseldorf. Düsseldorf.
 Verein der Düsseldorfer Künstler (1963): Catalogue:Grosse Weihnachtsausstellung, 1953, der bildenden Künstler von Rheinland und Westfalen im Kunstpalast zu Düsseldorf. Düsseldorf.
 Verein der Düsseldorfer Künstler (1964): Catalogue:Grosse Weihnachtsausstellung, 1953, der bildenden Künstler von Rheinland und Westfalen im Kunstpalast zu Düsseldorf. Düsseldorf.

External links
modern & contemporary artists and art

German Expressionist painters
20th-century German painters
German women painters
1994 deaths
1897 births
20th-century German women